More veneto (Latin for 'according to the customs of Venice') is a designation of the peculiar calendar used in the Republic of Venice, resulting from the delayed adoption of the Gregorian calendar.

Continuing the ancient Roman custom, the Venetian year began on 1 March, which was celebrated as the New Year's Day festival (Capodanno). Although the Gregorian calendar was created in 1582 and was known in the territories of Venice, it never entered official use: the more veneto continued until the Fall of the Venetian Republic in 1797. As a result, the months of January and February were always reckoned as belonging in more veneto to the previous year from the Gregorian years (e.g., February 1700 CE would be February 1699 more veneto).

See also
 Mores
 Byzantine calendar
 Florentine calendar
 Pisan calendar

Republic of Venice
Time in Italy
Julian calendar
Solar calendars
Specific calendars
Latin words and phrases